Lysapsus bolivianus is a species of frog in the family Hylidae endemic to the Amazon valley in Bolivia and Brazil.

References

Frogs of South America
Lysapsus